Maurice Cann (23 March 1911 – February 1989) was a British former Grand Prix motorcycle road racer. He entered his first Manx Grand Prix in 1931, and in 1938 competed in his first Isle of Man TT. Cann won the 1948 Lightweight TT aboard a Moto Guzzi. He competed from 1949 to 1952 in the Grand Prix world championships. He won his first time in world championship competition in the 250cc class at the 1949 Ulster Grand Prix, also on a Moto Guzzi.

World Championship results 

(key) (Races in bold indicate pole position; races in italics indicate fastest lap.)

References

1911 births
1989 deaths
British motorcycle racers
250cc World Championship riders
Isle of Man TT riders